is Chara's first and currently only live album, marketed as a 'live best album', released on March 8, 2000. It features recordings from her tours Chara Junior Sweet Tour, Chara Strange Fruits the Live, Chara Strange Fruits the Concert and Chara Concert Tour Duce & the Aurora Band. It debuted at #20 on the Japanese Oricon album charts, and charted in the top 200 for 4 weeks. It eventually sold a total of 45,000 copies.

Between 1997 and 1999, Chara performed live venues with her back-up band, the Aurora Band. The band also served as a session band during the recording of her 7th album, Strange Fruits. Only Duca and Tsutawatte feature on this live album, however.

The album consists of recordings from six dates from across four different tours, featuring three different venues. The bulk of the album comes from the Chara Concert Tour Duca & the Aurora Band concert at the NHK Hall on 1998.10.22: 8 songs were performed there.

Other recordings of the November 1, 1997 Chara Junior Sweet Tour concert exist. In fact, a VHS of this concert simply titled 1997.11.1 was released, featuring both recordings found on this album, along with 8 others.

Track listing

Sound Sources

Japan Sales Rankings

References
 	

Chara (singer) live albums
2000 live albums
Albums recorded at Akasaka Blitz